The Verrières Viaduct is a curved 720-metre concrete autoroute box girder bridge in the south of France, which at one point was briefly the highest bridge in France; it is almost 500 feet tall.

History

Design
It would be the highest bridge in France. It has a concrete road deck, built on steel girders. The concrete piers are from 40 metres to 140 metres in height. Société d'études techniques et économiques (SETEC) carried out design work for the shape of the road deck.

P3 pier would be the highest at 141.36m.

Construction
In August 1999, construction began of the steel deck structure on-site. In January 2002, the bridge deck was incrementally launched from one side. The bridge was too high to be built with a crane. 6,200 tonnes of steel were built, with 22,000 cubic metres of concrete for the five concrete piers. Groupe Razel built the concrete piers.

The steelwork was built by Société d'études R. Foucault et Associés (SERF) of Cergy in Paris (Île-de-France).

Construction finished in January 2002.

Structure
The bridge is one of the highest in France, and is almost 500 feet high. The road deck is curved.

References

External links
 Structurae
 Highest Bridges

2002 establishments in France
Box girder bridges in France
Bridges completed in 2002
Buildings and structures in Aveyron
Concrete bridges in France
Transport in Occitania (administrative region)
Viaducts in France
21st-century architecture in France